Women's 10 metre air rifle was one of the thirteen shooting events at the 1988 Summer Olympics. It was the second installment of the event.

Qualification round

OR Olympic record – Q Qualified for final

Final

OR Olympic record

References

Sources

Shooting at the 1988 Summer Olympics
Olymp
Shoo